Ledyard may refer to:

Ledyard (name)
Ledyard, Connecticut, United States
Ledyard, Iowa, United States
Ledyard, New York, United States
Ledyard Bridge, connecting New Hampshire and Vermont, United States